The Malawi women's national cricket team represents the country of Malawi in women's cricket matches.

In April 2018, the International Cricket Council (ICC) granted full Women's Twenty20 International (WT20I) status to all its members. Therefore, all Twenty20 matches played between Malawi women and another international side since 1 July 2018 have been full WT20I matches.

Malawi's first WT20I matches were contested as part of the Botswana 7s tournament in August 2018 against Botswana, Lesotho, Mozambique, Namibia, Sierra Leone and Zambia (Zambia's matches were not classified as WT20Is as they had a Botswanan player in their squad). Malawi finished fifth on the table with one win and four losses and won the fifth place play off against Lesotho by a margin of nine wickets.

In December 2020, the ICC announced the qualification pathway for the 2023 ICC Women's T20 World Cup. The Malawi women's team are scheduled to make their debut at an ICC women's event when they play in the 2021 ICC Women's T20 World Cup Africa Qualifier group.

Records and statistics
International Match Summary — Malawi Women
 
Last updated 10 November 2019

Twenty20 International 
 Highest team total: 135/8 v Lesotho on 21 August 2018 at Botswana Cricket Association Oval 2, Gaborone. 
 Highest individual score: 34*, Shahida Hussein v Mozambique on 7 November 2019 at Saint Andrews International High School, Blantyre. 
 Best individual bowling figures: 5/16, Triphonia Luka v Mozambique on 7 November 2019 at Saint Andrews International High School, Blantyre. 

T20I record versus other nations 

Records complete to WT20I #797. Last updated 10 November 2019.

See also
 List of Malawi women Twenty20 International cricketers

References

Women's
Women's national cricket teams
Cricket